Kunitz-type protease inhibitor 1 is an enzyme that in humans is encoded by the SPINT1 gene.

The protein encoded by this gene is a member of the Kunitz family of serine protease inhibitors. The protein is a potent inhibitor specific for HGF activator and is thought to be involved in the regulation of the proteolytic activation of HGF in injured tissues. Alternative splicing results in multiple variants encoding different isoforms.

References

Further reading

Serine protease inhibitors